Magic bullet may refer to:

 Enchanted bullet obtained through a contract with the devil in the German folk legend Freischütz
 Der Freischütz, an opera by Carl Maria von Weber based on the legend
 Magic bullet (medicine), the pharmacological ideal of a drug able to selectively target a disease without other effects on the body, originally defined by Paul Ehrlich as a drug for antibacterial therapy
Dr. Ehrlich's Magic Bullet, a 1940 Hollywood biopic about syphilis researcher Paul Ehrlich, starring Edward G. Robinson
 "Magic Bullet Theory", the name commonly assigned to the single-bullet theory by its critics in the investigation of the John F. Kennedy assassination
 Hypodermic needle model or magic bullet theory, a model of communications in media theory
 Magic Bullet (appliance), a compact blender manufactured by Homeland Housewares
 "The Magic Bullet" (Angel), episode 19 of season 4 of television series Angel
 Magic Bullet Productions, an audio-production company
 Bullet catch, an illusion in which someone appears to catch a fired bullet
 Magic Bullet Records, an American record label

See also
 Silver bullet